Sir Banja Tejan-Sie  (1917-2000) was the Governor General of Sierra Leone and one of the "founding fathers" of the Sierra Leone People's Party (SLPP). He was knighted by Her Majesty The Queen, with the most distinguished Order - The Grand Cross of the Order of St Michael and St George, GCMG. Tejan-Sie was born in Moyamba District (in the current Southern Province) to a famous Muslim cleric and scholar from the Fulah tribe. Tejan-Sie was educated at the Bo School and the Prince of Wales School before continuing his education at the London School of Economics and Lincoln's Inn, where he was called to the bar in 1951.

Political career

In 1951, Tejan-Sie lost an election for a seat in the Parliament; despite this he was appointed as one of the two National Vice Presidents of the SLPP in 1953. However, in 1957, after losing his second election, Tejan-Sie began a career in the judiciary. In 1962, he was elected to the position made empty in the legislature of Speaker of the House by Sir Henry Josiah Lightfoot Boston, who became Governor-General of Sierra Leone.

In 1967, a military coup overthrew the government and set up the National Reformation Council. Tejan-Sie was appointed to the position of Chief Justice of the Supreme Court, which he held until 1968. In that same year, when civilian control was restored, he was appointed as Governor-General. In 1971, when Sierra Leone was declared a republic, Tejan-Sie went into exile in England, where lived for the rest of his life, although he did visit Sierra Leone again in 1987 at the behest of then President Joseph Saidu Momoh.

References

External links

https://www.theguardian.com/news/2000/sep/12/guardianobituaries1
 Sierra Leone People's Party biography of Tejan-Sie
 Profile of Sierra Leonean Independence leaders

1917 births
2000 deaths
Knights Bachelor
Speakers of the Parliament of Sierra Leone
Alumni of the London School of Economics
Sierra Leonean knights
20th-century Sierra Leonean judges
Governors-General of Sierra Leone
Knights Grand Cross of the Order of St Michael and St George
Sierra Leone People's Party politicians
Chief justices of Sierra Leone
People from Moyamba District
Sierra Leonean Fula people